Michigan's 21st Senate district is one of 38 districts in the Michigan Senate. The 21st district was created by the 1850 Michigan Constitution, as the 1835 constitution only permitted a maximum of eight senate districts. It has been represented by Democrat Sarah Anthony since 2023, succeeding Republican Kim LaSata.

Geography
District 21 encompasses all of Eaton County, as well as part of Ingham County.

2011 Apportionment Plan
District 21, as dictated by the 2011 Apportionment Plan, covered Berrien, Cass, and St. Joseph Counties in far southwest Michigan. Communities in the district included Benton Harbor, Niles, St. Joseph, Buchanan, Benton Heights, Fair Plain, Paw Paw Lake, Dowagiac, Sturgis, Three Rivers, Benton Township, Lincoln Township, Niles Township, and St. Joseph Township.

The district was located entirely within Michigan's 6th congressional district, and overlapped with the 59th, 78th, and 79th districts of the Michigan House of Representatives. It bordered the state of Indiana, as well as Lake Michigan.

List of senators

Recent election results

2018

2014

Federal and statewide results in District 21

Historical district boundaries

References 

21
Berrien County, Michigan
Cass County, Michigan
St. Joseph County, Michigan